The Fourteenth Amendment (Amendment XIV) to the United States Constitution was adopted on July 9, 1868, as one of the Reconstruction Amendments. Often considered as one of the most consequential amendments, it addresses citizenship rights and equal protection under the law and was proposed in response to issues related to former slaves following the American Civil War. The amendment was bitterly contested, particularly by the states of the defeated Confederacy, which were forced to ratify it in order to regain representation in Congress. The amendment, particularly its first section, is one of the most litigated parts of the Constitution, forming the basis for landmark Supreme Court decisions such as Brown v. Board of Education (1954) regarding racial segregation, Roe v. Wade (1973) regarding abortion (overturned in 2022), Bush v. Gore (2000) regarding the 2000 presidential election, and Obergefell v. Hodges (2015) regarding same-sex marriage. The amendment limits the actions of all state and local officials, and also those acting on behalf of such officials.

The amendment's first section includes several clauses: the Citizenship Clause, Privileges or Immunities Clause, Due Process Clause, and Equal Protection Clause. The Citizenship Clause provides a broad definition of citizenship, nullifying the Supreme Court's decision in Dred Scott v. Sandford (1857), which had held that Americans descended from African slaves could not be citizens of the United States. Since the Slaughter-House Cases (1873), the Privileges or Immunities Clause has been interpreted to do very little.

The Due Process Clause prohibits state and local governments from depriving persons of life, liberty, or property without a fair procedure. The Supreme Court has ruled this clause makes most of the Bill of Rights as applicable to the states as it is to the federal government, as well as to recognize substantive and procedural requirements that state laws must satisfy. The Equal Protection Clause requires each state to provide equal protection under the law to all people, including all non-citizens, within its jurisdiction. This clause has been the basis for many decisions rejecting irrational or unnecessary discrimination against people belonging to various groups.

The second, third, and fourth sections of the amendment are seldom litigated. However, the second section's reference to "rebellion, or other crime" has been invoked as a constitutional ground for felony disenfranchisement. The fourth section was held, in Perry v. United States (1935), to prohibit a current Congress from abrogating a contract of debt incurred by a prior Congress. The fifth section gives Congress the power to enforce the amendment's provisions by "appropriate legislation"; however, under City of Boerne v. Flores (1997), this power may not be used to contradict a Supreme Court decision interpreting the amendment.

Section 1: Citizenship and civil rights

Background

Section 1 of the amendment formally defines United States citizenship and also protects various civil rights from being abridged or denied by any state or state actor. Abridgment or denial of those civil rights by private persons is not addressed by this amendment.  The Supreme Court held in Civil Rights Cases (1883) that the amendment was limited to "state action" and, therefore, did not authorize the Congress to outlaw racial discrimination by private individuals or organizations.  However, Congress can sometimes reach such discrimination via other parts of the Constitution such as the Commerce Clause which Congress used to enact the Civil Rights Act of 1964—the Supreme Court upheld this approach in Heart of Atlanta Motel v. United States (1964).

U.S. Supreme Court Justice Joseph P. Bradley commented in the Civil Rights Cases that "individual invasion of individual rights is not the subject-matter of the [Fourteenth] Amendment. It has a deeper and broader scope. It nullifies and makes void all state legislation, and state action of every kind, which impairs the privileges and immunities of citizens of the United States, or which injures them in life, liberty or property without due process of law, or which denies to any of them the equal protection of the laws."

The Radical Republicans who advanced the Thirteenth Amendment hoped to ensure broad civil and human rights for the newly freed people—but its scope was disputed before it even went into effect. The framers of the Fourteenth Amendment wanted these principles enshrined in the Constitution to protect the new Civil Rights Act from being declared unconstitutional by the Supreme Court and also to prevent a future Congress from altering it by a mere majority vote.

This section was also in response to violence against black people within the Southern States. The Joint Committee on Reconstruction found that only a Constitutional amendment could protect black people's rights and welfare within those states. The U.S. Supreme Court stated in Shelley v. Kraemer (1948) that the historical context leading to the Fourteenth Amendment's adoption must be taken into account, that this historical context reveals the Amendment's fundamental purpose and that the provisions of the Amendment are to be construed in light of this fundamental purpose. In its decision the Court said:

Section 1 has been the most frequently litigated part of the amendment, and this amendment in turn has been the most frequently litigated part of the Constitution.

Citizenship Clause

The Citizenship Clause overruled the Supreme Court's Dred Scott decision that black people were not citizens and could not become citizens, nor enjoy the benefits of citizenship. Some members of Congress voted for the Fourteenth Amendment in order to eliminate doubts about the constitutionality of the Civil Rights Act of 1866, or to ensure that no subsequent Congress could later repeal or alter the main provisions of that Act. The Civil Rights Act of 1866 had granted citizenship to all people born in the United States if they were not subject to a foreign power, and this clause of the Fourteenth Amendment constitutionalized this rule. According to Garrett Epps, professor of constitutional law at the University of Baltimore, "Only one group is not 'subject to the jurisdiction' [of the United States] – accredited foreign diplomats and their families, who can be expelled by the federal government but not arrested or tried." The U.S. Supreme Court stated in Elk v. Wilkins (1884) with respect to the purpose of the Citizenship Clause and the words "persons born or naturalized in the United States" and "subject to the jurisdiction thereof" in this context:

There are varying interpretations of the original intent of Congress and of the ratifying states, based on statements made during the congressional debate over the amendment, as well as the customs and understandings prevalent at that time. Some of the major issues that have arisen about this clause are the extent to which it included Native Americans, its coverage of non-citizens legally present in the United States when they have a child, whether the clause allows revocation of citizenship, and whether the clause applies to illegal immigrants.

Historian Eric Foner, who has explored the question of U.S. birthright citizenship to other countries, argues that:

Garrett Epps also stresses, like Eric Foner, the equality aspect of the Fourteenth Amendment:

Native Americans
During the original congressional debate over the amendment Senator Jacob M. Howard of Michigan—the author of the Citizenship Clause—described the clause as having the same content, despite different wording, as the earlier Civil Rights Act of 1866, namely, that it excludes Native Americans who maintain their tribal ties and "persons born in the United States who are foreigners, aliens, who belong to the families of ambassadors or foreign ministers". According to historian Glenn W. LaFantasie of Western Kentucky University, "A good number of his fellow senators supported his view of the citizenship clause." Others also agreed that the children of ambassadors and foreign ministers were to be excluded.

Senator James Rood Doolittle of Wisconsin asserted that all Native Americans were subject to United States jurisdiction, so that the phrase "Indians not taxed" would be preferable, but Senate Judiciary Committee Chairman Lyman Trumbull and Howard disputed this, arguing that the federal government did not have full jurisdiction over Native American tribes, which govern themselves and make treaties with the United States. In Elk v. Wilkins (1884), the clause's meaning was tested regarding whether birth in the United States automatically extended national citizenship. The Supreme Court held that Native Americans who voluntarily quit their tribes did not automatically gain national citizenship. The issue was resolved with the passage of the Indian Citizenship Act of 1924, which granted full U.S. citizenship to indigenous peoples.

Children born to foreign nationals
The Fourteenth Amendment provides that children born in the United States and subject to its jurisdiction become American citizens at birth. The principal framer John Armor Bingham said during the 39th United States Congress two years before its passing:

At the time of the amendment's passage, President Andrew Johnson and three senators, including Trumbull, the author of the Civil Rights Act, asserted that both the Civil Rights Act and the Fourteenth Amendment would confer citizenship to children born to foreign nationals in the United States. Senator Edgar Cowan of Pennsylvania had a decidedly different opinion. Some scholars dispute whether the Citizenship Clause should apply to the children of unauthorized immigrants today, as "the problem... did not exist at the time". In the 21st century, Congress has occasionally discussed passing a statute or a constitutional amendment to reduce the practice of "birth tourism", in which a foreign national gives birth in the United States to gain the child's citizenship.

The clause's meaning with regard to a child of immigrants was tested in United States v. Wong Kim Ark (1898). The Supreme Court held that under the Fourteenth Amendment, a man born within the United States to Chinese citizens who have a permanent domicile and residence in the United States and are carrying out business in the United States—and whose parents were not employed in a diplomatic or other official capacity by a foreign power—was a citizen of the United States. Subsequent decisions have applied the principle to the children of foreign nationals of non-Chinese descent.

According to the Foreign Affairs Manual, which is published by the State Department, "Despite widespread popular belief, U.S. military installations abroad and U.S. diplomatic or consular facilities abroad are not part of the United States within the meaning of the [Fourteenth] Amendment."

Loss of citizenship
Loss of national citizenship is possible only under the following circumstances:
 Fraud in the naturalization process. Technically, this is not a loss of citizenship but rather a voiding of the purported naturalization and a declaration that the immigrant never was a citizen of the United States.
 Affiliation with an "anti-American" organization (such as the Communist party or other totalitarian party, or a terrorist organization) within five years of naturalization. The State Department views such affiliations as sufficient evidence that an applicant must have lied or concealed evidence in the naturalization process.
 Other-than-honorable discharge from the U.S. armed forces before five years of honorable service, if honorable service was the basis for the naturalization.
 Voluntary relinquishment of citizenship. This may be accomplished either through renunciation procedures specially established by the State Department or through other actions that demonstrate desire to give up national citizenship.

For much of the country's history, voluntary acquisition or exercise of a foreign citizenship was considered sufficient cause for revocation of national citizenship. This concept was enshrined in a series of treaties between the United States and other countries (the Bancroft Treaties). However, the Supreme Court repudiated this concept in Afroyim v. Rusk (1967), as well as Vance v. Terrazas (1980), holding that the Citizenship Clause of the Fourteenth Amendment barred the Congress from revoking citizenship. However, it has been argued that Congress can revoke citizenship that it has previously granted to a person not born in the United States.

Privileges or Immunities Clause

The Privileges or Immunities Clause, which protects the privileges and immunities of national citizenship from interference by the states, was patterned after the Privileges and Immunities Clause of Article IV, which protects the privileges and immunities of state citizenship from interference by other states. In the Slaughter-House Cases (1873), the Supreme Court concluded that the Constitution recognized two separate types of citizenship—"national citizenship" and "state citizenship"—and the Court held that the Privileges or Immunities Clause prohibits states from interfering only with privileges and immunities possessed by virtue of national citizenship. The Court concluded that the privileges and immunities of national citizenship included only those rights that "owe their existence to the Federal government, its National character, its Constitution, or its laws." The Court recognized few such rights, including access to seaports and navigable waterways, the right to run for federal office, the protection of the federal government while on the high seas or in the jurisdiction of a foreign country, the right to travel to the seat of government, the right to peaceably assemble and petition the government, the privilege of the writ of habeas corpus, and the right to participate in the government's administration. This decision has not been overruled and has been specifically reaffirmed several times. Largely as a result of the narrowness of the Slaughter-House opinion, this clause subsequently lay dormant for well over a century.

In Saenz v. Roe (1999), the Court ruled that a component of the "right to travel" is protected by the Privileges or Immunities Clause:

Justice Miller actually wrote in the Slaughter-House Cases that the right to become a citizen of a state (by residing in that state) "is conferred by the very article under consideration" (emphasis added), rather than by the "clause" under consideration.

In McDonald v. Chicago (2010), Justice Clarence Thomas, while concurring with the majority in incorporating the Second Amendment against the states, declared that he reached this conclusion through the Privileges or Immunities Clause instead of the Due Process Clause. Randy Barnett has referred to Justice Thomas's concurring opinion as a "complete restoration" of the Privileges or Immunities Clause.

In Timbs v. Indiana (2019), Justice Thomas and Justice Neil Gorsuch, in separate concurring opinions, declared the Excessive Fines Clause of the Eighth Amendment was incorporated against the states through the Privileges or Immunities Clause instead of the Due Process Clause.

Due Process Clause

General aspects 

Due process deals with the administration of justice and thus the due process clause acts as a safeguard from arbitrary denial of life, liberty, or property by the government outside the sanction of law. The Supreme Court has described due process consequently as "the protection of the individual against arbitrary action." In 1855, the Supreme Court explained that, to ascertain whether a process is due process, the first step is to "examine the constitution itself, to see whether this process be in conflict with any of its provisions." In Hurtado v. California (1884), the U.S. Supreme Court said:

The Due Process Clause has been used to strike down legislation. The Fifth and Fourteenth Amendments for example do not prohibit governmental regulation for the public welfare. Instead, they only direct the process by which such regulation occurs. As the Court has held before, such due process "demands only that the law shall not be unreasonable, arbitrary, or capricious, and that the means selected shall have a real and substantial relation to the object sought to be attained." Despite the foregoing citation the Due Process Clause enables the Supreme Court to exercise its power of judicial review, "because the due process clause has been held by the Court applicable to matters of substantive law as well as to matters of procedure." Justice Louis Brandeis observed in his concurrence opinion in Whitney v. California, 274 U.S. 357, 373 (1927), that "[d]espite arguments to the contrary which had seemed to me persuasive, it is settled that the due process clause of the Fourteenth Amendment applies to matters of substantive law as well as to matters of procedure. Thus all fundamental rights comprised within the term liberty are protected by the Federal Constitution from invasion by the States."

The Due Process Clause of the Fourteenth Amendment applies only against the states, but it is otherwise textually identical to the Due Process Clause of the Fifth Amendment, which applies against the federal government; both clauses have been interpreted to encompass identical doctrines of procedural due process and substantive due process. Procedural due process is the guarantee of a fair legal process when the government tries to interfere with a person's protected interests in life, liberty, or property, and substantive due process is the guarantee that the fundamental rights of citizens will not be encroached on by government. Furthermore, as observed by Justice John M. Harlan II in his dissenting opinion in Poe v. Ullman, 367 U.S. 497, 541 (1961), quoting Hurtado v. California, 110 U.S. 516, 532 (1884), "the guaranties of due process, though having their roots in Magna Carta's 'per legem terrae' and considered as procedural safeguards 'against executive usurpation and tyranny', have in this country 'become bulwarks also against arbitrary legislation'." In Planned Parenthood v. Casey (1992) it was observed: "Although a literal reading of the Clause might suggest that it governs only the procedures by which a State may deprive persons of liberty, for at least 105 years, since Mugler v. Kansas, 123 U. S. 623, 660-661 (1887), the Clause has been understood to contain a substantive component as well, one "barring certain government actions regardless of the fairness of the procedures used to implement them." Daniels v. Williams, 474 U. S. 327, 331 (1986)." The Due Process Clause of the Fourteenth Amendment also incorporates most of the provisions in the Bill of Rights, which were originally applied against only the federal government, and applies them against the states. The Due Process clause applies regardless whether one is a citizen of the United States of America or not.

Specific aspects 
The Supreme Court of the United States interprets the clauses broadly, concluding that these clauses provide three protections: procedural due process (in civil and criminal proceedings); substantive due process; and as the vehicle for the incorporation of the Bill of Rights. These aspects will be discussed in the sections below.

Substantive due process

Beginning with Allgeyer v. Louisiana (1897), the U.S. Supreme Court interpreted the Due Process Clause as providing substantive protection to private contracts, thus prohibiting a variety of social and economic regulation; this principle was referred to as "freedom of contract". A unanimous court held with respect to the noun "liberty" mentioned in the Fourteenth Amendment's Due Process Clause:

The 'liberty' mentioned in [the Fourteenth] amendment means not only the right of the citizen to be free from the mere physical restraint of his person, as by incarceration, but the term is deemed to embrace the right of the citizen to be free in the enjoyment of all his faculties, to be free to use them in all lawful ways, to live and work where he will, to earn his livelihood by any lawful calling, to pursue any livelihood or avocation, and for that purpose to enter into all contracts which may be proper, necessary, and essential to his carrying out to a successful conclusion the purposes above mentioned.

Relying on the principle of "freedom of contract" the Court struck down a law decreeing maximum hours for workers in a bakery in Lochner v. New York (1905) and struck down a minimum wage law in Adkins v. Children's Hospital (1923). In Meyer v. Nebraska (1923), the Court stated that the "liberty" protected by the Due Process Clause

However, the Court did uphold some economic regulation, such as state Prohibition laws (Mugler v. Kansas, 1887), laws declaring maximum hours for mine workers (Holden v. Hardy, 1898), laws declaring maximum hours for female workers (Muller v. Oregon, 1908), and President Woodrow Wilson's intervention in a railroad strike (Wilson v. New, 1917), as well as federal laws regulating narcotics (United States v. Doremus, 1919). The Court repudiated, but did not explicitly overrule, the "freedom of contract" line of cases in West Coast Hotel v. Parrish (1937). In its decision the Court stated:

The Court has interpreted the term "liberty" in the Due Process Clauses of the Fifth and Fourteenth Amendments in Bolling v. Sharpe (1954) broadly:

In Poe v. Ullman (1961), dissenting Justice John Marshall Harlan II adopted a broad view of the "liberty" protected by the Fourteenth Amendment Due Process clause:

Although the "freedom of contract" described above has fallen into disfavor, by the 1960s, the Court had extended its interpretation of substantive due process to include other rights and freedoms that are not enumerated in the Constitution but that, according to the Court, extend or derive from existing rights. For example, the Due Process Clause is also the foundation of a constitutional right to privacy. The Court first ruled that privacy was protected by the Constitution in Griswold v. Connecticut (1965), which overturned a Connecticut law criminalizing birth control. While Justice William O. Douglas wrote for the majority that the right to privacy was found in the "penumbras" of various provisions in the Bill of Rights, Justices Arthur Goldberg and John Marshall Harlan II wrote in concurring opinions that the "liberty" protected by the Due Process Clause included individual privacy. The above mentioned broad view of liberty embraced by dissenting Justice John Marshall Harlan II in Poe v. Ullman (1961) was adopted by the Supreme Court in Griswold v. Connecticut.

The right to privacy was the basis for Roe v. Wade (1973), in which the Court invalidated a Texas law forbidding abortion except to save the mother's life. Like Goldberg's and Harlan's concurring opinions in Griswold, the majority opinion authored by Justice Harry Blackmun located the right to privacy in the Due Process Clause's protection of liberty. The decision disallowed many state and federal abortion restrictions, and it became one of the most controversial in the Court's history. In Planned Parenthood v. Casey (1992), the Court decided that "the essential holding of Roe v. Wade should be retained and once again reaffirmed."  The Court overruled both Roe and Casey in Dobbs v. Jackson Women's Health Organization (2022).  Dobbs signals a new era of weakening of the Allgeyer Court's understanding of liberty.

In Lawrence v. Texas (2003), the Court found that a Texas law against same-sex sexual intercourse violated the right to privacy. In Obergefell v. Hodges (2015), the Court ruled that the fundamental right to marriage included same-sex couples being able to marry.

Procedural due process
When the government seeks to burden a person's protected liberty interest or property interest, the Supreme Court has held that procedural due process requires that, at a minimum, the government provide the person notice, an opportunity to be heard at an oral hearing, and a decision by a neutral decision-maker. For example, such process is due when a government agency seeks to terminate civil service employees, expel a student from public school, or cut off a welfare recipient's benefits. The Court has also ruled that the Due Process Clause requires judges to recuse themselves in cases where the judge has a conflict of interest. For example, in Caperton v. A.T. Massey Coal Co. (2009), the Court ruled that a justice of the Supreme Court of Appeals of West Virginia had to recuse himself from a case involving a major contributor to his campaign for election to that court.

Incorporation of the Bill of Rights

While many state constitutions are modeled after the United States Constitution and federal laws, those state constitutions did not necessarily include provisions comparable to the Bill of Rights. In Barron v. Baltimore (1833), the Supreme Court unanimously ruled that the Bill of Rights restrained only the federal government, not the states. However, the Supreme Court has subsequently held that most provisions of the Bill of Rights apply to the states through the Due Process Clause of the Fourteenth Amendment under a doctrine called "incorporation".

Whether incorporation was intended by the amendment's framers, such as John Bingham, has been debated by legal historians. According to legal scholar Akhil Reed Amar, the framers and early supporters of the Fourteenth Amendment believed that it would ensure that the states would be required to recognize the same individual rights as the federal government; all these rights were likely understood as falling within the "privileges or immunities" safeguarded by the amendment.

By the latter half of the 20th century, nearly all of the rights in the Bill of Rights had been applied to the states. The Supreme Court has held that the amendment's Due Process Clause incorporates all of the substantive protections of the First, Second, Fourth, Fifth (except for its Grand Jury Clause) and Sixth Amendments, along with the Excessive Fines Clause and Cruel and Unusual Punishment Clause of the Eighth Amendment. While the Third Amendment has not been applied to the states by the Supreme Court, the Second Circuit ruled that it did apply to the states within that circuit's jurisdiction in Engblom v. Carey. The Seventh Amendment right to jury trial in civil cases has been held not to be applicable to the states, but the amendment's Re-Examination Clause does apply to "a case tried before a jury in a state court and brought to the Supreme Court on appeal."

The Excessive Fines Clause of the Eighth Amendment became the last right to be incorporated when the Supreme Court ruled in Timbs v. Indiana (2019) that right to apply to the states.

Equal Protection Clause

The Equal Protection Clause was created largely in response to the lack of equal protection provided by law in states with Black Codes. Under Black Codes, blacks could not sue, give evidence, or be witnesses. They also were punished more harshly than whites. The Supreme Court in Strauder v. West Virginia (1880) said the Fourteenth Amendment not only gave citizenship and the privileges of citizenship to persons of color, it denied to any State the power to withhold from them the equal protection of the laws, and authorized Congress to enforce its provisions by appropriate legislation. In this decision the Supreme Court stated specifically that the Equal Protection Clause was

The Equal Protection Clause applies to citizens and non-citizens alike. The clause mandates that individuals in similar situations be treated equally by the law. The purpose of the clause is not only to guarantee equality both in laws for security of person as well as in proceedings, but also to insure the "equal right to the laws of due process and impartially administered before the courts of justice." Although the text of the Fourteenth Amendment applies the Equal Protection Clause only against the states, the Supreme Court, since Bolling v. Sharpe (1954), has applied the clause against the federal government through the Due Process Clause of the Fifth Amendment under a doctrine called "reverse incorporation".

In Yick Wo v. Hopkins (1886), the Supreme Court has clarified that the meaning of "person" and "within its jurisdiction" in the Equal Protection Clause would not be limited to discrimination against African Americans, but would extend to other races, colors, and nationalities such as (in this case) legal aliens in the United States who are Chinese citizens:

Persons "within its jurisdiction" are entitled to equal protection from a state. Largely because the Privileges and Immunities Clause of Article IV has from the beginning guaranteed the privileges and immunities of citizens in the several states, the Supreme Court has rarely construed the phrase "within its jurisdiction" in relation to natural persons. In Plyler v. Doe (1982), where the Court held that aliens illegally present in a state are within its jurisdiction and may thus raise equal protection claims the Court explicated the meaning of the phrase "within its jurisdiction" as follows: "[U]se of the phrase 'within its jurisdiction' confirms the understanding that the Fourteenth Amendment's protection extends to anyone, citizen or stranger, who is subject to the laws of a State, and reaches into every corner of a State's territory." The Court reached this understanding among other things from Senator Howard, a member of the Joint Committee of Fifteen, and the floor manager of the amendment in the Senate. Senator Howard was explicit about the broad objectives of the Fourteenth Amendment and the intention to make its provisions applicable to all who "may happen to be" within the jurisdiction of a state:

The relationship between the Fifth and Fourteenth Amendments was addressed by Justice Field in Wong Wing v. United States (1896). He observed with respect to the phrase "within its jurisdiction": "The term 'person', used in the Fifth Amendment, is broad enough to include any and every human being within the jurisdiction of the republic. A resident, alien born, is entitled to the same protection under the laws that a citizen is entitled to. He owes obedience to the laws of the country in which he is domiciled, and, as a consequence, he is entitled to the equal protection of those laws. ... The contention that persons within the territorial jurisdiction of this republic might be beyond the protection of the law was heard with pain on the argument at the bar—in face of the great constitutional amendment which declares that no State shall deny to any person within its jurisdiction the equal protection of the laws."

The Supreme Court also decided whether foreign corporations are also within the jurisdiction of a state, ruling that a foreign corporation which sued in a state court in which it was not licensed to do business to recover possession of property wrongfully taken from it in another state was within the jurisdiction and could not be subjected to unequal burdens in the maintenance of the suit. When a state has admitted a foreign corporation to do business within its borders, that corporation is entitled to equal protection of the laws but not necessarily to identical treatment with domestic corporations.

In Santa Clara County v. Southern Pacific Railroad (1886), the court reporter included a statement by Chief Justice Morrison Waite in the decision's headnote:

This dictum, which established that corporations enjoyed personhood under the Equal Protection Clause, was repeatedly reaffirmed by later courts. It remained the predominant view throughout the twentieth century, though it was challenged in dissents by justices such as Hugo Black and William O. Douglas. Between 1890 and 1910, Fourteenth Amendment cases involving corporations vastly outnumbered those involving the rights of blacks, 288 to 19.

In the decades following the adoption of the Fourteenth Amendment, the Supreme Court overturned laws barring blacks from juries (Strauder v. West Virginia, 1880) or discriminating against Chinese Americans in the regulation of laundry businesses (Yick Wo v. Hopkins, 1886), as violations of the Equal Protection Clause. However, in Plessy v. Ferguson (1896), the Supreme Court held that the states could impose racial segregation so long as they provided similar facilities—the formation of the "separate but equal" doctrine.

The Court went even further in restricting the Equal Protection Clause in Berea College v. Kentucky (1908), holding that the states could force private actors to discriminate by prohibiting colleges from having both black and white students. By the early 20th century, the Equal Protection Clause had been eclipsed to the point that Justice Oliver Wendell Holmes, Jr. dismissed it as "the usual last resort of constitutional arguments."

The Court held to the "separate but equal" doctrine for more than fifty years, despite numerous cases in which the Court itself had found that the segregated facilities provided by the states were almost never equal, until Brown v. Board of Education (1954) reached the Court. In Brown the Court ruled that even if segregated black and white schools were of equal quality in facilities and teachers, segregation was inherently harmful to black students and so was unconstitutional. Brown met with a campaign of resistance from white Southerners, and for decades the federal courts attempted to enforce Browns mandate against repeated attempts at circumvention. This resulted in the controversial desegregation busing decrees handed down by federal courts in various parts of the nation. In Parents Involved in Community Schools v. Seattle School District No. 1 (2007), the Court ruled that race could not be the determinative factor in determining to which public schools parents may transfer their children.

In Plyler v. Doe (1982) the Supreme Court struck down a Texas statute denying free public education to illegal immigrants as a violation of the Equal Protection Clause of the Fourteenth Amendment because discrimination on the basis of illegal immigration status did not further a substantial state interest. The Court reasoned that illegal aliens and their children, though not citizens of the United States or Texas, are people "in any ordinary sense of the term" and, therefore, are afforded Fourteenth Amendment protections.

In Hernandez v. Texas (1954), the Court held that the Fourteenth Amendment protects those beyond the racial classes of white or "Negro" and extends to other racial and ethnic groups, such as Mexican Americans in this case. In the half-century following Brown, the Court extended the reach of the Equal Protection Clause to other historically disadvantaged groups, such as women and illegitimate children, although it has applied a somewhat less stringent standard than it has applied to governmental discrimination on the basis of race (United States v. Virginia (1996); Levy v. Louisiana (1968)).

The Supreme Court ruled in Regents of the University of California v. Bakke (1978) that affirmative action in the form of racial quotas in public university admissions was a violation of Title VI of the Civil Rights Act of 1964; however, race could be used as one of several factors without violating of the Equal Protection Clause or Title VI. In Gratz v. Bollinger (2003) and Grutter v. Bollinger (2003), the Court considered two race-conscious admissions systems at the University of Michigan. The university claimed that its goal in its admissions systems was to achieve racial diversity. In Gratz, the Court struck down a points-based undergraduate admissions system that added points for minority status, finding that its rigidity violated the Equal Protection Clause; in Grutter, the Court upheld a race-conscious admissions process for the university's law school that used race as one of many factors to determine admission. In Fisher v. University of Texas (2013), the Court ruled that before race can be used in a public university's admission policy, there must be no workable race-neutral alternative. In Schuette v. Coalition to Defend Affirmative Action (2014), the Court upheld the constitutionality of a state constitutional prohibition on the state or local use of affirmative action.

Reed v. Reed (1971), which struck down an Idaho probate law favoring men, was the first decision in which the Court ruled that arbitrary gender discrimination violated the Equal Protection Clause. In Craig v. Boren (1976), the Court ruled that statutory or administrative sex classifications had to be subjected to an intermediate standard of judicial review. Reed and Craig later served as precedents to strike down a number of state laws discriminating by gender.

Since Wesberry v. Sanders (1964) and Reynolds v. Sims (1964), the Supreme Court has interpreted the Equal Protection Clause as requiring the states to apportion their congressional districts and state legislative seats according to "one man, one vote". The Court has also struck down redistricting plans in which race was a key consideration. In Shaw v. Reno (1993), the Court prohibited a North Carolina plan aimed at creating majority-black districts to balance historic underrepresentation in the state's congressional delegations.

The Equal Protection Clause served as the basis for the decision in Bush v. Gore (2000), in which the Court ruled that no constitutionally valid recount of Florida's votes in the 2000 presidential election could be held within the needed deadline; the decision effectively secured Bush's victory in the disputed election. In League of United Latin American Citizens v. Perry (2006), the Court ruled that House Majority Leader Tom DeLay's Texas redistricting plan intentionally diluted the votes of Latinos and thus violated the Equal Protection Clause.

State actor doctrine

Before United States v. Cruikshank, 92 U.S. 542 (1876) was decided by United States Supreme Court, the case was decided as a circuit case (Federal Cases No. 14897). Presiding of this circuit case was judge Joseph P. Bradley who wrote at page 710 of Federal Cases No. 14897 regarding the Fourteenth Amendment to the United States Constitution:

The above quote was quoted by United Supreme Court in United States v. Harris, 106 U.S. 629 (1883) and supplemented by a quote from the majority opinion in United States v. Cruikshank, 92 U.S. 542 (1876) as written by Chief Justice Morrison Waite:

Individual liberties guaranteed by the United States Constitution, other than the Thirteenth Amendment's ban on slavery, protect not against actions by private persons or entities, but only against actions by government officials. Regarding the Fourteenth Amendment, the Supreme Court ruled in Shelley v. Kraemer (1948): "[T]he action inhibited by the first section of the Fourteenth Amendment is only such action as may fairly be said to be that of the States. That Amendment erects no shield against merely private conduct, however discriminatory or wrongful." The court added in Civil Rights Cases (1883): "It is State action of a particular character that is prohibited. Individual invasion of individual rights is not the subject matter of the amendment. It has a deeper and broader scope. It nullifies and makes void all State legislation, and State action of every kind, which impairs the privileges and immunities of citizens of the United States, or which injures them in life, liberty, or property without due process of law, or which denies to any of them the equal protection of the laws."

Vindication of federal constitutional rights are limited to those situations where there is "state action" meaning action of government officials who are exercising their governmental power. In Ex parte Virginia (1880), the Supreme Court found that the prohibitions of the Fourteenth Amendment "have reference to actions of the political body denominated by a State, by whatever instruments or in whatever modes that action may be taken. A State acts by its legislative, its executive, or its judicial authorities. It can act in no other way. The constitutional provision, therefore, must mean that no agency of the State, or of the officers or agents by whom its powers are exerted, shall deny to any person within its jurisdiction the equal protection of the laws. Whoever, by virtue of public position under a State government, deprives another of property, life, or liberty, without due process of law, or denies or takes away the equal protection of the laws, violates the constitutional inhibition; and as he acts in the name and for the State, and is clothed with the State's power, his act is that of the State. This must be so, or the constitutional prohibition has no meaning. [...] But the constitutional amendment was ordained for a purpose. It was to secure equal rights to all persons, and, to insure to all persons the enjoyment of such rights, power was given to Congress to enforce its provisions by appropriate legislation. Such legislation must act upon persons, not upon the abstract thing denominated a State, but upon the persons who are the agents of the State in the denial of the rights which were intended to be secured."

There are however instances where people are the victims of civil-rights violations that occur in circumstances involving both government officials and private actors. In the 1960s, the United States Supreme Court adopted an expansive view of state action opening the door to wide-ranging civil-rights litigation against private actors when they act as state actors (i.e., acts done or otherwise "sanctioned in some way" by the state). The Court found that the state action doctrine is equally applicable to denials of privileges or immunities, due process, and equal protection of the laws.

The critical factor in determining the existence of state action is not governmental involvement with private persons or private corporations, but "the inquiry must be whether there is a sufficiently close nexus between the State and the challenged action of the regulated entity so that the action of the latter may be fairly treated as that of the State itself." "Only by sifting facts and weighing circumstances can the nonobvious involvement of the State in private conduct be attributed its true significance."

The Supreme Court asserted that plaintiffs must establish not only that a private party "acted under color of the challenged statute, but also that its actions are properly attributable to the State." "And the actions are to be attributable to the State apparently only if the State compelled the actions and not if the State merely established the process through statute or regulation under which the private party acted."

The rules developed by the Supreme Court for business regulation are that (1) the "mere fact that a business is subject to state regulation does not by itself convert its action into that of the State for purposes of the Fourteenth Amendment," and (2) "a State normally can be held responsible for a private decision only when it has exercised coercive power or has provided such significant encouragement, either overt or covert, that the choice must be deemed to be that of the State."

Section 2: Apportionment of Representatives

Under Article I, Section 2, Clause 3, the basis of representation of each state in the House of Representatives was determined by adding three-fifths of each state's slave population to its free population. Because slavery (except as punishment for crime) had been abolished by the Thirteenth Amendment, the freed slaves would henceforth be given full weight for purposes of apportionment. This situation was a concern to the Republican leadership of Congress, who worried that it would increase the political power of the former slave states, even as such states continued to deny freed slaves the right to vote.

Two solutions were considered:
 reduce the Congressional representation of the former slave states (for example, by basing representation on the number of legal voters rather than the number of inhabitants)
 guarantee freed slaves the right to vote

On January 31, 1866, the House of Representatives voted in favor of a proposed constitutional amendment that would reduce a state's representation in the House in proportion to which that state used "race or color" as a basis to deny the right to vote in that state. The amendment failed in the Senate, partly because radical Republicans foresaw that states would be able to use ostensibly race-neutral criteria, such as educational and property qualifications, to disenfranchise the freed slaves without negative consequence. So the amendment was changed to penalize states in which the vote was denied to male citizens over twenty-one for any reason other than participation in crime. Later, the Fifteenth Amendment was adopted to guarantee the right to vote could not be denied based on race or color.

The effect of Section 2 was twofold:
 Although the three-fifths clause was not formally repealed, it was effectively removed from the Constitution. In the words of the Supreme Court in Elk v. Wilkins, Section2 "abrogated so much of the corresponding clause of the original Constitution as counted only three-fifths of such persons [slaves]."
 It was intended to penalize, by means of reduced Congressional representation, states that withheld the franchise from adult male citizens for any reason other than participation in crime. This, it was hoped, would induce the former slave states to recognize the political rights of the former slaves, without directly forcing them to do so—something that it was thought the states would not accept.

Enforcement

The first reapportionment after the enactment of the Fourteenth Amendment occurred in 1873, based on the 1870 census. Congress appears to have attempted to enforce the provisions of Section 2, but was unable to identify enough disenfranchised voters to make a difference to any state's representation. In the implementing statute, Congress added a provision stating that  A nearly identical provision remains in federal law to this day.

Despite this legislation, in subsequent reapportionments, no change has ever been made to any state's Congressional representation on the basis of the Amendment. Bonfield, writing in 1960, suggested that "[t]he hot political nature of such proposals has doomed them to failure." Aided by this lack of enforcement, southern states continued to use pretexts to prevent many blacks from voting until the passage of the Voting Rights Act of 1965.

In the Fourth Circuit case of Saunders v Wilkins (1945), Saunders claimed that Virginia should have its Congressional representation reduced because of its use of a poll tax and other voting restrictions. The plaintiff sued for the right to run for Congress at large in the state, rather than in one of its designated Congressional districts. The lawsuit was dismissed as a political question.

Influence on voting rights

Some have argued that Section 2 was implicitly repealed by the Fifteenth Amendment, but the Supreme Court acknowledged Section2 in later decisions.

In Minor v. Happersett (1875), the Supreme Court cited Section2 as supporting its conclusion that the right to vote was not among the "privileges and immunities of citizenship" protected by Section 1. Women would not achieve equal voting rights throughout the United States until the adoption of Nineteenth Amendment in 1920.

In Richardson v. Ramirez (1974), the Court cited Section2 in holding that Section 1's Equal Protection Clause does not prohibit states disenfranchising felons.

In Hunter v. Underwood (1985), a case involving disenfranchising black misdemeanants, the Supreme Court concluded that the Tenth Amendment cannot save legislation prohibited by the subsequently enacted Fourteenth Amendment. More specifically the Court concluded that laws passed with a discriminatory purpose are not excepted from the operation of the Equal Protection Clause by the "other crime" provision of Section 2. The Court held that Section2 "was not designed to permit the purposeful racial discrimination [...] which otherwise violates [Section]1 of the Fourteenth Amendment."

Criticism

Abolitionist leaders criticized the amendment's failure to specifically prohibit the states from denying people the right to vote on the basis of race.

Section 2 protects the right to vote only of adult males, not adult females, making it the only provision of the Constitution to explicitly discriminate on the basis of sex. Section2 was condemned by women's suffragists, such as Elizabeth Cady Stanton and Susan B. Anthony, who had long seen their cause as linked to that of black rights. The separation of black civil rights from women's civil rights split the two movements for decades.

Section 3: Disqualification from office for insurrection or rebellion

Soon after losing the Civil War in 1865, states that had been part of the Confederacy began to send "unrepentant" former Confederates (such as the Confederacy's former vice president, Alexander H. Stephens) to Washington as Senators and Representatives. Congress refused to seat them and drafted Section 3 to perpetuate, as a constitutional imperative, that any who violate their oath to the Constitution are to be barred from public office.
Section 3 disqualifies from federal or state office anyone who, having taken an oath as a public official to support the Constitution, subsequently engages in "insurrection or rebellion" against the United States or gives "aid and comfort" to its enemies.
Southerners strongly opposed it, arguing it would hurt reunification of the country.

Section 3 does not specify how it is to be invoked, but Section 5 says Congress has enforcement power.  Accordingly, Congress enforced Section 3 by enacting the Enforcement Act of 1870, the pertinent portion of which was repealed in 1948; there is still a current federal statute that was initially part of the Confiscation Act of 1862 (and revised in 1948), disqualifying insurrectionists from federal office. Moreover, each house of Congress can expel or exclude members for insurrection or other reasons, although it is uncertain whether more votes may be required to expel than to exclude.  A further way that Congress can enforce Section 3 is via impeachment, and even prior to the adoption of the Fourteenth Amendment Congress impeached and disqualified federal judge West Humphreys for insurrection.

After the amendment's adoption in 1868, disqualification was seldom enforced in the South.
At the urging of President Ulysses S. Grant, in 1872 Congress passed the Amnesty Act, which removed the disqualification from all but the most senior Confederates.
In 1898, as a "gesture of national unity" during the Spanish–American War, Congress passed another law broadening the amnesty.
Congress posthumously lifted the disqualification from Confederate general Robert E. Lee in 1975,
and Confederate president Jefferson Davis in 1978.
These waivers do not bar Section 3 from being used today.

Since Reconstruction, Section 3 has been invoked only once: it was used to block Socialist Party of America member Victor L. Berger of Wisconsinconvicted of violating the Espionage Act for opposing US entry into World War Ifrom assuming his seat in the House of Representatives in 1919 and 1920.
Berger's conviction was overturned by the Supreme Court in Berger v. United States (1921), after which he was elected to three successive terms in the 1920s; he was seated for all three terms.

January 6 United States Capitol attack

On January 10, 2021, Nancy Pelosi, the Speaker of the House, formally requested Representatives' input as to whether to pursue Section 3 disqualification of outgoing President Donald Trump because of his role in the January 6 United States Capitol attack.
Unlike impeachment, which requires a supermajority to convict, disqualification under Section 3 would only require a simple majority of each house of Congress.

The Section 3 disqualification could be imposed by Congress passing a law or a nonbinding resolution stating that the January 6 riot was an insurrection, and that anyone who swore to uphold the Constitution and who incited or participated in the riot is disqualified under Section 3.
Some legal experts believe a court would then be required to make a final determination that Trump was disqualified under Section 3.
A state may also make a determination that Trump is disqualified under Section 3 from appearing on that state's ballot.
Trump could appeal in court any disqualification by Congress or by a state.
In addition to state or federal legislative action, a court action could be brought against Trump seeking his disqualification under Section 3.

On January 11, 2021, Representative Cori Bush (D-MO) and 47 cosponsors introduced a resolution calling for expulsion, under Section 3, of members of Congress who voted against certifying the results of the 2020 US presidential election or incited the January 6 riot. Those named in the resolution included Republican Representatives Mo Brooks of Alabama and Louie Gohmert of Texas, who took part in the rally that preceded the riot, and Republican Senators Josh Hawley of Missouri and Ted Cruz of Texas, who objected to counting electoral votes to certify the 2020 presidential election result.

After Representative Madison Cawthorn (R-NC) declared his intent to run for re-election in 2022, a group of North Carolina voters from Cawthorn's district filed a lawsuit alleging that a speech he gave immediately prior to the Capitol attack incited it, and, therefore, Section 3 disqualified him from holding federal office. A federal judge entered a preliminary injunction in favor of Cawthorn, citing the Amnesty Act of 1872; however, on May 24, 2022, an appeals court ruled that this law applied only to people who committed "constitutionally wrongful acts" before 1872. A similar challenge, which a federal court declined to block, was filed against Marjorie Taylor Greene (R-GA) and heard in April 2022 in Atlanta. Greene sued to strike down the law that allowed contesting her eligibility as unconstitutional.

Otero County, New Mexico commissioner Couy Griffin was barred from holding public office for life in September 2022 by District Court Judge Francis Mathew who found his participation as the leader of the Cowboys for Trump group during the attack on the Capitol was an act of insurrection under Section 3. This is the first conviction under Section 3 since 1869 (save the previously mentioned overturned conviction).

Section 4: Validity of public debt

Section 4 confirmed the legitimacy of all public debt appropriated by the Congress. It also confirmed that neither the United States nor any state would pay for the loss of slaves or debts that had been incurred by the Confederacy. For example, during the Civil War several British and French banks had lent large sums of money to the Confederacy to support its war against the Union. In Perry v. United States (1935), the Supreme Court ruled that under Section4 voiding a United States bond "went beyond the congressional power."

The debt-ceiling crises of 2011 and 2013 raised the question of what the President's authority under Section 4 is. During the 2011 crisis, former President Bill Clinton said he would invoke the Fourteenth Amendment to raise the debt ceiling if he were still in office, and force a ruling by the Supreme Court. Some, such as legal scholar Garrett Epps, fiscal expert Bruce Bartlett and Treasury Secretary Timothy Geithner, have argued that a debt ceiling may be unconstitutional and therefore void as long as it interferes with the duty of the government to pay interest on outstanding bonds and to make payments owed to pensioners (that is, Social Security and Railroad Retirement Act recipients). Legal analyst Jeffrey Rosen has argued that Section4 gives the President unilateral authority to raise or ignore the national debt ceiling, and that if challenged the Supreme Court would likely rule in favor of expanded executive power or dismiss the case altogether for lack of standing.  Erwin Chemerinsky, professor and dean at University of California, Irvine School of Law, has argued that not even in a "dire financial emergency" could the President raise the debt ceiling as "there is no reasonable way to interpret the Constitution that [allows him to do so]." Jack Balkin, Knight Professor of Constitutional Law at Yale University, opined that like Congress the President is bound by the Fourteenth Amendment, for otherwise, he could violate any part of the amendment at will. Because the President must obey the Section4 requirement not to put the validity of the public debt into question, Balkin argued that President Obama would have been obliged "to prioritize incoming revenues to pay the public debt, interest on government bonds and any other 'vested' obligations. What falls into the latter category is not entirely clear, but a large number of other government obligations—and certainly payments for future services—would not count and would have to be sacrificed. This might include, for example, Social Security payments."

Section 5: Power of enforcement

The opinion of the Supreme Court in The Slaughter-House Cases, 83 U.S. (16 Wall.) 36 (1873) stated with a view to the Reconstruction Amendments and about the Fourteenth Amendment's Section5 Enforcement Clause in light of said Amendent's Equal Protection Clause:

Section 5, also known as the Enforcement Clause of the Fourteenth Amendment, enables Congress to pass laws enforcing the amendment's other provisions. In Ex Parte Virginia (1879) the U.S. Supreme Court explained the scope of Congress' §5 power in the following broad terms: "Whatever legislation is appropriate, that is, adapted to carry out the objects the amendments have in view, whatever tends to enforce submission to the prohibitions they contain, and to secure to all persons the enjoyment of perfect equality of civil rights and the equal protection of the laws against State denial or invasion, if not prohibited, is brought within the domain of congressional power." In the Civil Rights Cases (1883), the Supreme Court interpreted Section5 narrowly, stating that "the legislation which Congress is authorized to adopt in this behalf is not general legislation upon the rights of the citizen, but corrective legislation." In other words, the amendment authorizes Congress to pass laws only to combat violations of the rights protected in other sections.

In Katzenbach v. Morgan (1966), the Court upheld Section 4(e) of the Voting Rights Act of 1965, which prohibits certain forms of literacy requirements as a condition to vote, as a valid exercise of Congressional power under Section5 to enforce the Equal Protection Clause. The Court ruled that Section5 enabled Congress to act both remedially and prophylactically to protect the rights guaranteed by the amendment. However, in City of Boerne v. Flores (1997), the Court narrowed Congress's enforcement power, holding that Congress may not enact legislation under Section5 that substantively defines or interprets Fourteenth Amendment rights. The Court ruled that legislation is valid under Section5 only if there is a "congruence and proportionality" between the injury to a person's Fourteenth Amendment right and the means Congress adopted to prevent or remedy that injury.

Selected Supreme Court cases

Citizenship

 1884: Elk v. Wilkins
 1898: United States v. Wong Kim Ark
 1967: Afroyim v. Rusk
 1980: Vance v. Terrazas

Privileges or immunities

 1873: Slaughter-House Cases
 1875: Minor v. Happersett
 1908: Twining v. New Jersey
 1920: United States v. Wheeler
 1948: Oyama v. California
 1999: Saenz v. Roe

Incorporation

 1833: Barron v. Baltimore
 1873: Slaughter-House Cases
 1883: Civil Rights Cases
 1884: Hurtado v. California
 1897: Chicago, Burlington & Quincy Railroad v. Chicago
 1900: Maxwell v. Dow
 1908: Twining v. New Jersey
 1925: Gitlow v. New York
 1932: Powell v. Alabama
 1937: Palko v. Connecticut
 1947: Adamson v. California
 1947: Everson v. Board of Education
 1952: Rochin v. California
 1961: Mapp v. Ohio
 1962: Robinson v. California
 1963: Gideon v. Wainwright
 1964: Malloy v. Hogan
 1967: Reitman v. Mulkey
 1968: Duncan v. Louisiana
 1969: Benton v. Maryland
 1970: Goldberg v. Kelly
 1972: Furman v. Georgia
 1974: Goss v. Lopez
 1975: O'Connor v. Donaldson
 1976: Gregg v. Georgia
 2010: McDonald v. Chicago
 2019: Timbs v. Indiana
 2022: New York State Rifle & Pistol Association, Inc. v. Bruen

Substantive due process

 1876: Munn v. Illinois
 1887: Mugler v. Kansas
 1897: Allgeyer v. Louisiana
 1905: Lochner v. New York
 1908: Muller v. Oregon
 1923: Adkins v. Children's Hospital
 1923: Meyer v. Nebraska
 1925: Pierce v. Society of Sisters
 1934: Nebbia v. New York
 1937: West Coast Hotel Co. v. Parrish
 1965: Griswold v. Connecticut
 1973: Roe v. Wade
 1977: Moore v. City of East Cleveland
 1990: Cruzan v. Director, Missouri Department of Health
 1992: Planned Parenthood v. Casey
 1996: BMW of North America, Inc. v. Gore
 1997: Washington v. Glucksberg
 2003: State Farm v. Campbell
 2003: Lawrence v. Texas
 2015: Obergefell v. Hodges
 2022: Dobbs v. Jackson Women's Health Organization

Equal protection

 1880: Strauder v. West Virginia
 1886: Yick Wo v. Hopkins
 1886: Santa Clara County v. Southern Pacific Railroad
 1896: Plessy v. Ferguson
 1908: Berea College v. Kentucky
 1916: The People of the State of California v. Jukichi Harada
 1917: Buchanan v. Warley
 1942: Skinner v. Oklahoma
 1944: Korematsu v. United States
 1948: Shelley v. Kraemer
 1954: Hernandez v. Texas
 1954: Brown v. Board of Education
 1954:  Bolling v. Sharpe
 1962: Baker v. Carr
 1967: Loving v. Virginia
 1971: Reed v. Reed
 1971: Palmer v. Thompson
 1972: Eisenstadt v. Baird
 1973: San Antonio Independent School District v. Rodriguez
 1976: Examining Board v. Flores de Otero
 1978: Regents of the University of California v. Bakke
 1982: Plyler v. Doe
 1982: Mississippi University for Women v. Hogan
 1986: Posadas de Puerto Rico Associates v. Tourism Company of Puerto Rico
 1996: United States v. Virginia
 1996: Romer v. Evans
 2000: Bush v. Gore
 2003: Grutter v. Bollinger

Felon disenfranchisement
 1974: Richardson v. Ramirez
 1985: Hunter v. Underwood

Power of enforcement

 1883: Civil Rights Cases
 1966: Katzenbach v. Morgan
 1976: Fitzpatrick v. Bitzer
 1997: City of Boerne v. Flores
 1999: Florida Prepaid Postsecondary Education Expense Board v. College Savings Bank
 2000: United States v. Morrison
 2000: Kimel v. Florida Board of Regents
 2001: Board of Trustees of the University of Alabama v. Garrett
 2003: Nevada Department of Human Resources v. Hibbs
 2004: Tennessee v. Lane
 2013: Shelby County v. Holder

Adoption

Proposal by Congress

In the final years of the American Civil War and the Reconstruction Era that followed, Congress repeatedly debated the rights of black former slaves freed by the 1863 Emancipation Proclamation and the 1865 Thirteenth Amendment, the latter of which had formally abolished slavery. Following the passage of the Thirteenth Amendment by Congress, however, Republicans grew concerned over the increase it would create in the congressional representation of the Democratic-dominated Southern States. Because the full population of freed slaves would now be counted for determining congressional representation, rather than the three-fifths previously mandated by the Three-Fifths Compromise, the Southern States would dramatically increase their power in the population-based House of Representatives, regardless of whether the former slaves were allowed to vote. Republicans began looking for a way to offset this advantage, either by protecting and attracting votes of former slaves, or at least by discouraging their disenfranchisement.

In 1865, Congress passed what would become the Civil Rights Act of 1866, guaranteeing citizenship without regard to race, color, or previous condition of slavery or involuntary servitude. The bill also guaranteed equal benefits and access to the law, a direct assault on the Black Codes passed by many post-war states. The Black Codes attempted to return ex-slaves to something like their former condition by, among other things, restricting their movement, forcing them to enter into year-long labor contracts, prohibiting them from owning firearms, and preventing them from suing or testifying in court.

Although strongly urged by moderates in Congress to sign the bill, President Andrew Johnson vetoed it on March 27, 1866. In his veto message, he objected to the measure because it conferred citizenship on the freedmen at a time when 11 out of 36 states were unrepresented in the Congress, and that it discriminated in favor of African-Americans and against whites. Three weeks later, Johnson's veto was overridden and the measure became law. Despite this victory, even some Republicans who had supported the goals of the Civil Rights Act began to doubt that Congress really possessed constitutional power to turn those goals into laws. The experience also encouraged both radical and moderate Republicans to seek Constitutional guarantees for black rights, rather than relying on temporary political majorities.

More than seventy proposals for an amendment were drafted. In an extensive appendix to his dissenting opinion in Adamson v. California (1947), Justice Hugo Black analyzed and detailed the statements made by "those who framed, advocated, and adopted the Amendment" and thus shed some light on the history of the amendment's adoption. In late 1865, the Joint Committee on Reconstruction proposed an amendment stating that any citizens barred from voting on the basis of race by a state would not be counted for purposes of representation of that state. This amendment passed the House, but was blocked in the Senate by a coalition of Radical Republicans led by Charles Sumner, who believed the proposal a "compromise with wrong", and Democrats opposed to black rights. Consideration then turned to a proposed amendment by Representative John A. Bingham of Ohio, which would enable Congress to safeguard "equal protection of life, liberty, and property" of all citizens; this proposal failed to pass the House. In April 1866, the Joint Committee forwarded a third proposal to Congress, a carefully negotiated compromise that combined elements of the first and second proposals as well as addressing the issues of Confederate debt and voting by ex-Confederates. The House of Representatives passed House Resolution 127, 39th Congress several weeks later and sent to the Senate for action. The resolution was debated and several amendments to it were proposed. Amendments to Sections 2, 3, and4 were adopted on June 8, 1866, and the modified resolution passed by a 33 to 11 vote (5 absent, not voting). The House agreed to the Senate amendments on June 13 by a 138–36 vote (10 not voting). A concurrent resolution requesting the President to transmit the proposal to the governors of the states was passed by both houses of Congress on June 18.

The Radical Republicans were satisfied that they had secured civil rights for blacks but were disappointed that the amendment would not also secure political rights for blacks; in particular, the right to vote. For example, Thaddeus Stevens, a leader of the disappointed Radical Republicans, said: "I find that we shall be obliged to be content with patching up the worst portions of the ancient edifice, and leaving it, in many of its parts, to be swept through by the tempests, the frosts, and the storms of despotism." Abolitionist Wendell Phillips called it a "fatal and total surrender". This point would later be addressed by the Fifteenth Amendment.

Ratification by the states

On June 16, 1866, Secretary of State William Seward transmitted the Fourteenth Amendment to the governors of the several states for its ratification. State legislatures in every formerly Confederate state, with the exception of Tennessee, refused to ratify it. This refusal led to the passage of the Reconstruction Acts. Ignoring the existing state governments, military government was imposed until new civil governments were established and the Fourteenth Amendment was ratified. It also prompted Congress to pass a law on March 2, 1867, requiring that a former Confederate state must ratify the Fourteenth Amendment before "said State shall be declared entitled to representation in Congress."

The first 28 states to ratify the Fourteenth Amendment were:
 Connecticut: June 30, 1866
 New Hampshire: July 6, 1866
 Tennessee: July 18, 1866
 New Jersey: September 11, 1866 (rescinded ratification February 20, 1868/March 24, 1868; re-ratified April 23, 2003)
 Oregon: September 19, 1866 (rescinded ratification October 16, 1868; re-ratified April 25, 1973)
 Vermont: October 30, 1866
 New York: January 10, 1867
 Ohio: January 11, 1867 (rescinded ratification January 13, 1868; re-ratified March 12, 2003)
 Illinois: January 15, 1867
 West Virginia: January 16, 1867
 Michigan: January 16, 1867
 Minnesota: January 16, 1867
 Kansas: January 17, 1867
 Maine: January 19, 1867
 Nevada: January 22, 1867
 Indiana: January 23, 1867
 Missouri: January 25, 1867
 Pennsylvania: February 6, 1867
 Rhode Island: February 7, 1867
 Wisconsin: February 13, 1867
 Massachusetts: March 20, 1867
 Nebraska: June 15, 1867
 Iowa: March 16, 1868
 Arkansas: April 6, 1868
 Florida: June 9, 1868
 North Carolina: July 4, 1868 (after rejection December 14, 1866)
 Louisiana: July 9, 1868 (after rejection February 6, 1867)
 South Carolina: July 9, 1868 (after rejection December 20, 1866)

If rescission by Ohio and New Jersey were illegitimate, South Carolina would have been the 28th state to ratify the amendment, enough for the amendment to be a part of the Constitution. Otherwise, only 26 states ratified the amendment out of the needed 28. Ohio and New Jersey's rescissions (which occurred after Democrats retook the states legislature) caused significant controversy and debate, but as this controversy occurred ratification by other states continued:

On July 20, 1868, Secretary of State William H. Seward certified that if withdrawals of ratification by New Jersey and Ohio were illegitimate, then the amendment had become part of the Constitution on July 9, 1868, with ratification by South Carolina as the 28th state. The following day, Congress declared New Jersey's recession of the amendment "scandalous", rejected the act and then adopted and transmitted to the Department of State a concurrent resolution declaring the Fourteenth Amendment to be a part of the Constitution and directing the Secretary of State to promulgate it as such, thereby establishing a precedent that a state cannot rescind a ratification. Ultimately, New Jersey and Ohio were named in the congressional resolution as having ratified the amendment, as well as Alabama, making 29 states in total.

On the same day, one more State ratified:

On July 27, Secretary Seward received the formal ratification from Georgia. The following day, July 28, Secretary Seward issued his official proclamation certifying the adoption of the Fourteenth Amendment. Secretary Seward stated that his proclamation was "in conformance" to the resolution by Congress, but his official list of States included both Alabama and Georgia, as well as Ohio and New Jersey. Ultimately, regardless of the legal status of New Jersey's and Ohio's rescission, the amendment would have passed at the same time because of Alabama and Georgia's ratifications.

The inclusion of Ohio and New Jersey has led some to question the validity of the rescission of a ratification. The inclusion of Alabama and Georgia has called that conclusion into question. While there have been Supreme Court cases dealing with ratification issues, this particular question has never been adjudicated. On October 16, 1868, three months after the amendment was ratified and part of the Constitution, Oregon rescinded its ratification bringing the number of states that had the amendment actively ratified to 27 (for nearly a year), but this had no actual impact on the US Constitution or the 14th Amendment's standing.

The Fourteenth Amendment was subsequently ratified:

Since Ohio and New Jersey re-ratified the Fourteenth Amendment in 2003, all U.S. states that existed during Reconstruction have ratified the amendment.

See also
 Jus soli
 United States constitutional criminal procedure
 United States labor law

Notes

References

Bibliography
  Preview.
  Preview.
  Pdf.
  PDF.

Further reading
 
 
  Pdf.
 See also: Symposium: the Maryland Constitutional Law Schmooze special issue of the Maryland Law Review.
 
  Pdf.
 
 Response to McConnell: 
 Response to Klarman:

External links
  (PDF, providing text of amendment and dates of ratification)
 CRS Annotated Constitution: Fourteenth Amendment
 Fourteenth Amendment and related resources at the Library of Congress
 Congressional Debates of the Fourteenth Amendment to the United States Constitution, provides a transcript of the debates in Congress.
 

 
Fourteenth Amendment to the United States Constitution
1868 in American politics
Aftermath of the American Civil War
Amendments to the United States Constitution
Police legislation
History of civil rights in the United States
Reconstruction Era
United States Fourteenth Amendment case law
July 1868 events